"Eyes" is a song by American pop singer Donna Summer, released as the third and final single from her twelfth studio album Cats Without Claws (1984). The song as written by Summer and Michael Omartian and produced by the latter. It was released on May 14, 1985 by Geffen Records (US) and Warner Bros. Records (UK). Edited in length from the original version on the album and remixed by John "Jellybean" Benitez, the single peaked at No. 97 for one week in the UK Singles Chart.

A remix of the calypso-ish "I'm Free" from the Cats Without Claws album was included on the B-side of the UK release of the "Eyes" 12" single. "I'm Free" was performed by Summer and her back-up band on a Dick Clark's American Bandstand 1984 Christmas special, and Soul Train, indicating that the song had originally been intended to be the next single.

Track listing
 European 7"
 "Eyes (Edit)" – 3:45
 "It's Not the Way" – 4:22

 UK 12"
 "Eyes (Extended Mix)" – 6:58 (Remixed by John "Jellybean" Benitez)
 "I'm Free" – 6:18 (Remixed by John "Jellybean" Benitez)
 "It's Not the Way" – 4:22

 German 12"
 "Eyes (Extended Mix)" – 6:58 (Remixed by John "Jellybean" Benitez)
 "It's Not the Way" – 4:22

References

External links

1985 singles
Donna Summer songs
Songs written by Donna Summer
Songs written by Michael Omartian
Song recordings produced by Michael Omartian
1984 songs
American new wave songs
Geffen Records singles
Warner Records singles